Artur Rimovich Yusupov (born 1 September 1989) is a Russian professional footballer of Volga Tatar origin. He plays as a central midfielder for PFC Sochi.

Club career
He made his professional debut in the Russian Second Division in 2006 for FC Akademiya Tolyatti.

He made his Russian Premier League debut on 8 November 2009 for FC Dynamo Moscow in a game against PFC Spartak Nalchik.

He was released from his FC Zenit Saint Petersburg contract by mutual consent on 25 July 2018 and signed with FC Rostov on the same day.

On 11 January 2019, his FC Rostov contract was dissolved by mutual consent. On 14 January he returned to Dynamo Moscow.

On 7 September 2020, he joined PFC Sochi.

International
He made his debut for the national team on 17 November 2015 in a friendly game against Croatia.

Honours

Individual
Russian Premier League best goal of the month: August 2022.

Career statistics

Club

Notes

References

External links
 

1989 births
Sportspeople from Samara, Russia
Tatar people of Russia
Tatar sportspeople
Living people
Russian footballers
Association football midfielders
Russia youth international footballers
Russia under-21 international footballers
Russia national football B team footballers
Russia international footballers
FC Tolyatti players
FC Dynamo Moscow players
FC Khimki players
FC Zenit Saint Petersburg players
FC Rostov players
PFC Sochi players
Russian Premier League players
Russian First League players
Russian Second League players
UEFA Euro 2016 players